Manchester High School may mean any one of several educational institutions.

Jamaica
Manchester High School, Jamaica — Mandeville, Jamaica

United Kingdom:
Manchester High School for Girls — Manchester, England

United States:
Manchester High School (Connecticut) — Manchester, Connecticut
Manchester High School (Georgia) — Manchester, Georgia
Manchester High School (North Manchester, Indiana)
Manchester High School (Michigan) — Manchester, Michigan
Manchester Township High School — Manchester Township, New Jersey
Manchester High School (New Franklin, Ohio)
Manchester High School (Manchester, Ohio)
Manchester High School (Virginia) — Midlothian, Virginia
Manchester Central High School — Manchester, New Hampshire
Manchester-Essex Regional Junior-Senior High School — Manchester-by-the-Sea, Massachusetts
Manchester Memorial High School — Manchester, New Hampshire
Manchester Regional Academy — Manchester, Connecticut
Manchester High School West — Manchester, New Hampshire